Cacha is a town and also a district  in Chimborazo Province, Ecuador. It is home to people of the Puruhá ethnicity. The rural area is agricultural and is known for its indigenous people and artisanal crafts. Cacha is located at latitude -1.7 / -1° 42' 0.0" and longitude -78.6666667 / -78° 40' 0.0012". A local group, Duchicelas, is active in maintaining the area's musical traditions. Cacha was home to Fernando Daquilema (1845 - 1872), an indigenous rebel leader.

References

Populated places in Chimborazo Province